Foshan–Dongguan intercity railway, also called the Foguan intercity railway, is an under construction regional railway within Guangdong province, China, between the cities of Foshan, via Guangzhou, to Dongguan. It forms one leg of the Pearl River Delta Metropolitan Region intercity railway network and will provide connections with the Guangzhou–Shenzhen intercity railway, Dongguan–Huizhou intercity railway and local metro systems. It will connect Panyu District, Guangzhou at the major Guangzhou South interchange, tunnelling under the Pearl River through Machong and Hongmei to  providing connections via the Dongguan Rail Transit, the Guangzhou–Shenzhen intercity railway or the Dongguan–Huizhou intercity railway. The length of  the railway is 36.681 kilometres. Although this first phase of the project is named Foshan–Dongguan intercity railway, it does not pass through the city of Foshan in any way.

Overview
It is planned to use domestic CRH6 Intercity EMUs on this railway. Targeting a maximum operational speed of up to 200 km/h. According to the plans, construction was expected to start in 2014, with a construction time of about 5 years. It is expected to open in 2021.

Stations

References

Pearl River Delta
Rail transport in Guangdong
Railway lines in China